Albert A. Ultcht (1859–1943) was a two-term mayor of Melbourne, Florida from 1922 to 1924.

He was the son of August Ultcht.

He was an alderman in Mount Vernon, New York. In his capacity as alderman, he was a successful advocate for the "macadamizing" of public roads.

In 1914, he owned a Studebaker automobile dealership in Mount Vernon. This business was later named Vernon Heights Garage.

As mayor of Melbourne, he recommended to the City Council that they pass an ordinance to regulate the blowing of whistles by the passing railroad. It had been an ongoing source of complaints for many years. He advocated for the creation of a hospital, and contributed his salary and other mayoral fees to create a hospital building fund.

After his term, he was appointed a municipal judge.

In 1932, he and his son Floyd returned to Mount Vernon and reopened the dealership under the name Vernon Park Motors, Inc.

Associations 
 Niagara Hose Company Number 1, Mount Vernon
 I.O.O.F., Mount Vernon
 President, West Side Improvement Association, Mount Vernon
 Member, Firemans' Benevolent Association, Mount Vernon

Legacy 
 Ultcht Drive in Melbourne is named for him.

References 

1859 births
1943 deaths
People in the automobile industry
Florida Democrats
Mayors of Melbourne, Florida
Municipal judges in the United States
New York (state) city council members
New York (state) Democrats
Politicians from Mount Vernon, New York